Diminovula culmen is a species of sea snail in the family Ovulidae, the ovulids, cowry allies or false cowries.

Distribution
This marine species occurs off East Africa and in the Central Pacific.

References

 Lorenz F. & Fehse D. (2009) The living Ovulidae. A manual of the families of allied cowries: Ovulidae, Pediculariidae and Eocypraeidae. Hackenheim: Conchbooks.

External links
 
 

Ovulidae
Gastropods described in 1973